National Tertiary Route 735, or just Route 735 (or ) is a National Road Route of Costa Rica, located in the Alajuela province.

Description
In Alajuela province the route covers Upala canton (San José district).

References

Highways in Costa Rica